Needmore is the name of the following places in the U.S. state of Indiana:
Needmore, Brown County, Indiana
Needmore, Lawrence County, Indiana
Needmore, Vermillion County, Indiana